Dag Fornæss (born 30 June 1948) is a former speed skater from Norway who won the Norwegian, European, and World Allround Championships in 1969. He was born in Hamar.

Biography
Representing Hamar Idrettslag (Hamar Sports Club), Fornæss had his international breakthrough in 1969, when he won the Norwegian Allround Championships, the European Allround Championships, and the World Allround Championships. That same year, he also skated a new world record on the 3,000 m. For his accomplishments that year, Fornæss received the Oscar Mathisen Award and was chosen Norwegian Sportsperson of the Year.

He became European Allround Champion again in 1971. Fornæss participated in his last international event at the 1972 Winter Olympic Games, after which he ended his skating career.

Fornæss also was a successful association football player, playing in the Norwegian Premier League for the club Skeid Fotball in 1972. His grandfather, Embret Skogen, was an Olympic shooter.

Medals
An overview of medals won by Fornæss at important championships he participated in, listing the years in which he won each:

Records

World record 
Fornæss successively broke the 3,000 m record twice. world record:

Source: SpeedSkatingStats.com

Personal records 
To put these personal records in perspective, the column WR lists the official world records on the dates that Fornæss skated his personal records.

Fornæss has an Adelskalender score of 170.010 points. His highest ranking on the Adelskalender was a 3rd place.

References

 Eng, Trond. All Time International Championships, Complete Results: 1889 – 2002. Askim, Norway: WSSSA-Skøytenytt, 2002.
 Eng, Trond; Gjerde, Arild and Teigen, Magne. Norsk Skøytestatistikk Gjennom Tidene, Menn/Kvinner, 1999 (6. utgave). Askim/Skedsmokorset/Veggli, Norway: WSSSA-Skøytenytt, 1999.
 Eng, Trond; Gjerde, Arild; Teigen, Magne and Teigen, Thorleiv. Norsk Skøytestatistikk Gjennom Tidene, Menn/Kvinner, 2004 (7. utgave). Askim/Skedsmokorset/Veggli/Hokksund, Norway: WSSSA-Skøytenytt, 2004.
 Eng, Trond and Teigen, Magne. Komplette Resultater fra offisielle Norske Mesterskap på skøyter, 1894 – 2005. Askim/Veggli, Norway: WSSSA-Skøytenytt, 2005.
 Teigen, Magne. Komplette Resultater Norske Mesterskap På Skøyter, 1887 – 1989: Menn/Kvinner, Senior/Junior. Veggli, Norway: WSSSA-Skøytenytt, 1989.
 Teigen, Magne. Komplette Resultater Internasjonale Mesterskap 1889 – 1989: Menn/Kvinner, Senior/Junior, allround/sprint. Veggli, Norway: WSSSA-Skøytenytt, 1989.

External links
 Dag Fornæss at SpeedSkatingStats.com
 Personal records from Jakub Majerski's Speedskating Database
 Evert Stenlund's Adelskalender pages

1948 births
Living people
Sportspeople from Hamar
World record setters in speed skating
Norwegian male speed skaters
Olympic speed skaters of Norway
Speed skaters at the 1972 Winter Olympics
World Allround Speed Skating Championships medalists